Lanao del Sur (Maranao and ), officially the Province of Lanao del Sur, is a province in the Philippines located in the Bangsamoro Autonomous Region in Muslim Mindanao (BARMM). The capital is the city of Marawi, and it borders Lanao del Norte to the north, Bukidnon to the east, and Maguindanao del Norte and Cotabato to the south. To the southwest lies Illana Bay, an arm of the Moro Gulf.

Situated in the interior of Lanao del Sur is Lanao Lake, the largest in Mindanao.

Etymology
"Lanao" means "lake", derived from ranao. The province, situated at basin of Lake Lanao, is known as the land of the "Maranaos" (which means "the "people of the lake").

History

Pre-Islamic Era
Prior to the arrival of Islam, the region already had a sophisticated culture, as embodied in various Maranao epics, chants, and recorded history. The people of Lanao used to adhere to Hinduism, polytheist animism, and Buddhism. During this era, various cultural icons developed, such as the torogan, the singkil dance, the darangen epic, the unique Maranao gong and metal craft culture, the sarimanok, the okir motif, and an indigenous suyat script.

Sultanate of Lanao

Lanao was first explored by the Spaniards in 1689, upon which they discovered a well-settled community named Dansalan at the lake's northern end. Lanao was the seat of the Sultanate of Lanao.

During the Pre-Spanish time, there were 4 important boundaries which held the power of appointing a new sultan namely: Bakayawan, Dalama, Madamba and Sawer. In appointing a new sultan the permission of these four boundaries are needed to validate the new sultan appointed to his position.

World War II
In 1942, it was occupied by the Japanese Imperial Forces who landed in Southern Lanao. On May 2, 1942, the former Chief Justice of the Supreme Court of the Philippines José Abad Santos was killed by the Japanese Imperial forces in a firing squad at Malabang, Lanao del Sur. In 1945, the first of the liberation forces landed in Southern Lanao and liberated the area with United States, Philippine Commonwealth troops together with the Maranao guerrilla units. They used infantry weapons, the Maranao Kris, Barong and Kampilan swords against the Japanese forces in the Battle of Lanao.

In 1956, Republic Act No. 1552 changed the name Dansalan to Marawi, taken from the word rawi, referring to the reclining lilies abundant in the Agus River.

Division
 
In 1959, Lanao was divided into two provinces, Lanao del Norte and Lanao del Sur, under Republic Act No. 2228. Marawi was designated as the capital of Lanao del Sur. The city was renamed the "Islamic City of Marawi" in 1980, and is currently the Philippines' only city having a predominantly Muslim population.

Proposed Maranaw province
In 1971, Republic Act No. 6406, which sought to create a new province out of eastern Lanao del Sur (now corresponding to the province's first congressional district), was approved on October 4, 1971. The province was to consist of the municipalities of Bubong, Ditsaan-Ramain (including what is now Buadiposo-Buntong), Kapai, Lumba-Bayabao (including what is now Maguing), Marantao, Masiu, Mulondo, Saguiaran, Piagapo, Poona Bayabao, Tamparan, Taraka and Wao (including what is now Bumbaran), with the chartered city of Marawi serving as the new provincial capital. The division never took place due to the declaration of Martial law in the Philippines on September 21, 1972, which disrupted the elections for 1973.

Inclusion to the ARMM 
In a 1989 plebiscite, Lanao del Sur voted to join the Autonomous Region in Muslim Mindanao (ARMM), but the city of Marawi voted to remain outside the ARMM. It later joined ARMM in 2001 following the plebiscite that sought to expand the autonomous region.

Contemporary history 
The Battle of Marawi began and ended in 2017. The battle was against ISIL-affiliated militants, a number of which were Malaysian citizens. The battle destroyed most of the cityscape of Marawi and killed hundreds of civilians and Filipino soldiers.

A petition was released in support for the usage of the torogan as inspiration for the rehabilation of Marawi after the Battle of Marawi. The petition was released in opposition to the possible Manila Rehabilation Effect that the government plans to impose. The Manila-style rehabilation would establish shanty shouses and buildings without Maranao architectural styles, thus destroying Marawi's Maranao cultural skyline. The petition advocates a Warsaw-style Rehabilation Effect, where the culture and styles of a particular area is used as foundation for rehabilitation of built heritage and landscape. Among the local architectural styles that may be used under the Warsaw-style are the okir, sarimanok, and inspirations from the torogan. The Warsaw-style is also foreseen to boost tourism in the city in the long-run due to the cultural aesthetics it would bring.

Governors after People Power Revolution

Geography

Lanao del Sur forms the western portion of Northern Mindanao. It is bounded on the north by Lanao del Norte, on the east by Bukidnon, on the west by Illana Bay, and on the south by Maguindanao and Cotabato. The landscape is dominated by rolling hills and valleys, placid lakes and rivers.

Located within the province is Lanao Lake, the second largest in the country, its waters drained by the Agus River which eventually empties into the Iligan Bay.

The climate in the province is characterized by even distribution of rainfall throughout the year, without a distinct summer season. The province is located outside the typhoon belt.

Administrative divisions
Lanao del Sur comprises 39 municipalities and 1 city.

Demographics

The majority of people in the province are Maranaos, while some are Cebuanos, Zamboangueños, Tausugs, Yakans, and Sama.

Maranao is the most commonly spoken language in the province. Iranun is the native language of most of the inhabitants of the municipality of Kapatagan. Also spoken are Maguindanao, Cebuano, and Chavacano followed by Tagalog and English.

Religion
Most of the people of Lanao del Sur are practitioners of Islam. The majority of them are Sunni. The number of Muslims in this province is 872,678 or 94.00% of the total population of the province of Lanao Del Sur.

Economy

Schools/universities
 Dansalan College
Adiong Memorial Polytechnic State College
 Gandamatu Private Hospital, located in Macadar (Patka Apo)
 Lanao Agricultural College (LAC), located in Lumbatan
 Mindanao State University (Main Campus)
Jamiatu Muslim Mindanao (Arabic - English)
Tamparan Populace Islamic College (TPIC)
Philippine Muslim Teachers' College (PMTC)
Al Khwarizmi International College (AKIC)
Philippine Integrated School Foundation Inc. (PISFI)
Philippine Engineering and Agro-Industrial College, Inc. (PEACI)

UNESCO Designations in Lanao del Sur
UNESCO has inscribed one Maranao element, the Darangen Chants of the Maranao People of Lake Lanao, in the Representative List of the Intangible Cultural Heritage of Humanity in 2008. The element was earlier inscribed in the UNESCO Oral and Intangible Heritage of Humanity Representative List in 2005. The organization has also designated the Old Town of Tugaya as a UNESCO Home for Culture and Heritage. UNESCO has recommended for the nomination of Tugaya and all of Lanao del Sur's traditional crafts heritage in Representative List of the Intangible Cultural Heritage of Humanity, following reports made in 2014 and 2015. The Philippine ambassador to UNESCO and France noted that it will be better to inscribe Maranao's traditional crafts in the List of Intangible Cultural Heritage in Need of Urgent Safeguarding as they have been endangered due to the 2017 Battle of Marawi. The nomination is being finalized by the Philippine government, as announced in 2018. The torogans of Lanao are also recommended by UNESCO to be nominated in the World Heritage List once proper documentation and restoration has been completed. Two torogans have been bought by a controversial heritage resort company, Las Casas Filipinas de Acuzar, and were transported to Bataan, sparking a provincial campaign to get back the two royal houses to their ancestral homeland.

Hospitals
 Amai Pakpak Medical Center
 Former Libyan Hospital
 Dr. Abdullah Hospital

References

External links

 
 
 Philippine Census Information
 Local Governance Performance Management System

 
Provinces of the Philippines
Provinces of Bangsamoro
States and territories established in 1959
1959 establishments in the Philippines